Jamoris Slaughter (born December 22, 1989) is a former American football safety. He was drafted by the Cleveland Browns in the sixth round of the 2013 NFL Draft. He played college football at Notre Dame.

High school
Slaughter attended Tucker High School in Tucker, Georgia where he helped lead the Tigers to the Class AAAA state semifinals before losing to the eventual state champions. His team finished the season with a 13-1 record and ranked No. 2 in the state. He won region six as a senior with a 10-0 record and was member of a defense that allowed only six points per game (best in Class AAAA) and pitched seven shutouts, and was credited with 56 tackles, three interceptions and 11 pass break ups during senior season. He totaled 66 tackles, four interceptions and three forced fumbles as a junior. He also ran track and had personal bests of 10.9 in the 100-meter dash and 49.0 in the 400 meters.

Considered a four-star recruit by Rivals.com, he was rated as the 13th best safety in the nation. He committed to Notre Dame over offers from Clemson, Georgia and Oklahoma.

Professional career
Slaughter was selected by the Cleveland Browns in the sixth round (175th pick overall) of the 2013 NFL Draft. He signed a four-year contract with the Browns on May 21, 2013. After being released, he was assigned to the practice squad on September 1, 2013. He was waived on June 9, 2014.

References

External links
Notre Dame Fighting Irish bio

1989 births
Living people
American football safeties
Notre Dame Fighting Irish football players
Cleveland Browns players
Players of American football from Georgia (U.S. state)
People from Stone Mountain, Georgia
People from Tucker, Georgia
Sportspeople from DeKalb County, Georgia
Tucker High School alumni